Boomerang is a 2019 Indian Tamil-language action thriller film written, produced, and directed by R. Kannan. The film stars Atharvaa, Megha Akash, and Indhuja, while Upen Patel plays an antagonistic role alongside Sathish and RJ Balaji in supporting roles. The music was composed by Radhan with cinematography by Prasanna Kumar and editing by R. K. Selva. The film released on 8 March 2019.

Plot 

The movie begins in a hospital, with a patient being rushed to the operation theater. His name is revealed to be Siva, and his face is not shown at that moment. Siva's face sustained severe injuries in a fire accident, the doctors think that a face transplant is the only way out to rectify his facial deformities. At the same moment, another patient, Shakthi (Atharvaa), is admitted in the same hospital. He is declared brain dead, and the doctors request his mother, Gowri Thiruselvan (Suhasini Maniratnam), to donate his organs. Upon hearing the pleas of Siva's parents, she relents, and Shakthi's face is transplanted on to Siva. Siva, who gets a new lease of life, plans to start a business to take care of his family unaware of the issues he would be facing in the coming days. Siva gets attacked twice by some strangers, and he realizes that someone is after his life. Following a third attack, Siva and his friend Gopal (Sathish) think that the troublemakers could be targeting his face and not him in particular, as not many were aware of his face transplantation surgery. Siva learns from Gowri that his face donor (Shakti) was not really her son, and another friend reveals that he hailed from a village near Trichy. Siva travels to Trichy with Gopal and his girlfriend Gigi (Megha Akash) to enquire about Shakthi. Parallelly, it is revealed that Gigi had rejected Siva earlier (owing to not liking his looks prior to surgery), and during the train journey, Siva reveals his true identity. Gigi feels guilty and asks for his forgiveness, after which the two reconcile.

In Trichy, Siva and Gopal go about trying to find out more about Shakthi, when yet another attempt is made on Siva's life. He chases the perpetrators by car, but accidentally knocks down a person on the road. Out of guilt, Siva admits the person in a hospital, and there they meet Maya (Indhuja), who narrates Shakthi's life to them and reveals why people are after Siva. Shakthi, along with his friend Shanmugam (RJ Balaji) and Maya, used to work for a multinational company. Due to some internal conflicts, the three lose their jobs, along with many others. Shakthi gets frustrated and decides to go back to his village and do farming instead of continuing in the IT industry. Initially, Shakthi and his friends face resistance in the form of the local councilor Mayilvaganam (Ravi Mariya), who insisted that all farmers sell their lands to him for money instead of continuing agriculture. He even instigates Shakthi's father against his own son. In a public meeting with the villagers, Shakthi, Shanmugam, and Maya convince the villagers to help them unite a dry river in their village with an overflowing river in a village 20 km away, by building a canal. They reason that the other river has a surplus amount of water and often floods that village during monsoon, and the idea is to use the excess water by means of the canal for farming.

The villagers, pleased with the idea, offer their support to Shakthi. The three friends initially face tough challenges in the form the government officials and even the local police, but overcoming all struggles with the villagers' support, the trio protest in front of the district collector's office to obtain permission for constructing the canal. Things go awry when two goons enter the crowd in disguise and incite violence, thus forcing the police to charge on them. Initially miffed about the nuisance, the collector argues, but after hearing out Shakthi and his friends, he relents and gives permission. The canal construction works begin in full earnest. One day, a sudden landslide occurs, and in a bid to escape, a lot of people get buried underneath and lose their lives, including Shanmugam.

In the present day, Maya reveals that she never heard of Shakthi after that. She also tells that Shakthi felt very guilty of indirectly causing so much life loss. Intrigued, Siva requests Maya to tell more about the river interlinking project that they worked on. Shakthi's laptop is locked, and upon seeing a face recognition option, Siva unlocks it using his newly obtained face. The laptop contains details about various people supporting Shakthi and his friends in the initiative, including residents of that neighboring village. It also contains an unsent mail addressed to Maya. In an attached video, Shakthi in his final moments; tells that Maya needs to know certain truths. Shakti found that a bomb had actually triggered the landslide from a device that Shanmugam latched on to before his death, he rushes to the Sub-Inspector (E. Ramdoss) and urges him to take action.

The Sub-Inspector turns out to be a traitor and takes Shakthi to Sooraj (Upen Patel). It is revealed that Sooraj caused Shakthi and his friends to lose their jobs and also face all the trouble in the village. The goons at the collector's office too, are revealed to be henchmen sent by Sooraj, who even has Mailvaganam on his payroll. Sooraj wanted to privatize the electricity supply to the region and hence, caused so much trouble. In the ensuing fight, the Sub-Inspector gets killed, while Shakthi gets grievously injured on the head but somehow escapes from Sooraj before the latter could kill him. While escaping in a lorry, Shakthi records the video and attempts to send it to Maya. Siva is emotionally touched by Shakthi's story and decides to avenge his death by killing Sooraj. At this juncture, it is revealed that the person knocked down by Siva is none other than Sooraj himself, who realized that the person who saved him is not Shakthi, as Shakthi would never have done so. Sooraj tells Siva that he will instruct his henchmen to stand down, and Siva can go live a happy life. But Siva is not interested in helping Sooraj anymore. During their train journey, Gigi tells Siva about a drug that, when administered into a person, causes excessive adrenaline rush, eventually leading to death by loss of breath, while leaving no traces in the blood. Siva uses this drug to kill Sooraj, thus avenging Shakthi's death. In the final scene, Siva is shown getting down from a bus to go to Shakthi's village, presumably to continue Shakti's unfinished work.

Cast 

Atharvaa as Siva and Shakthi (Dual Role)
Megha Akash as Gigi, Siva's girlfriend
Indhuja as Maya, Shakthi and Shanmugam's colleague
Sathish as Gopal, Siva's friend
RJ Balaji as Shanmugam, Shakthi's friend
Upen Patel as Sooraj
Ravi Mariya as Councillor Mailvaganam
Rajendran as Film Producer
Ramkumar Ganesan as Akash, a channel owner
Malavika Avinash as Siva's mother
Jeeva Ravi as Siva's father
Shankar Sundaram as Shakthi's father
Suhasini Maniratnam as Gowri Thiruselvan
E. Ramdoss as Sub-Inspector Rajan
Vinodhini Vaidyanathan as Doctor
Dheshika Jagannathan as Siva's sister
Jenni as Shakthi's friend
Mayilsamy
Sampath Ram as Inspector
Supergood Subramani as Short Film Actor
Giri Dwarakish as Village Officer
Stunt Silva as Henchman out to kill Siva/Shakthi
Raja Elangovan
Master Arjun Kannan
Baby Laya Kannan
Raandilya as Rowdy
Mahendran as himself, Judge of a short film contest
G. Dhananjayan as himself, Judge of a short film contest
Narayan Lucky as himself, a cameo appearance

Production 
R. Kannan announced that he would direct and produce a new film starring Atharvaa in the lead role during October 2017. Megha Akash was signed on to portray the female lead actress, while Upen Patel was selected as the film's antagonist. For a particular look in the film, Atharvaa had to wear heavy prosthetic make-up with designers Preetisheel Singh and Mark Troy D’Souza assisting with the makeover.

The film was 90% completed by March 2018, before production was delayed as a result of an industry-wide strike the following month. The film was mainly shot for 45 days in and around Chennai, Aruppukottai, Virudhunagar and Theni, with a duet song shot in the Andaman Islands, before coming to a close in June 2018.

Soundtrack 
This music is composed by Radhan and released by Sony Music India.

Releases and reception 
Boomerang was released on 8 March 2019 Film Companion South wrote, "What promised to be pulpy fun, with the face swap, turns into a dully earnest story about river-linking. If we are going to continue to thrust serious issues into masala narratives, can we at least have better writing and filmmaking?".

The satellite rights of the film were sold to Zee Tamil and were premiered on April 14, 2019, a month after the film's theatrical release.

References

External links
 

2019 films
2019 action thriller films
2010s Tamil-language films
Indian action thriller films
Body swapping in films
Films directed by R. Kannan